Pacific Rendezvous is a 1942 American mystery film directed by George Sidney. It stars Lee Bowman and Jean Rogers.

The previous film version was the 1935 film Rendezvous,
starring William Powell and Rosalind Russell, directed by William K. Howard and Sam Wood. P. J. Wolfson and George Oppenheimer were credited with the screenplay of Rendezvous, and Bella Spewack and Samuel Spewack were credited as adapters of the book The American Black Chamber by Major Herbert O. Yardley (1931).

Plot summary
A code expert (Lee Bowman) working for Naval Intelligence is assigned to decode enemy messages despite his desire for active duty.

Cast

Production
The film was directed by George Sidney who says that George Seitz meant to direct the film but dropped out at the last minute. Sidney directed a screen test for Lee Bowman. He used Jean Rogers to appear alongside him and MGM executives liked the test so much that both were cast in the film. The film was shot in 22 days although Sidney was unhappy he had so little preparation time.

Reception
According to MGM records the film earned $253,000 in the US and Canada and $154,000 elsewhere, making the studio a profit of $23,000.

References

External links
 
 
 
 

1942 films
Films directed by George Sidney
Metro-Goldwyn-Mayer films
Films produced by B. F. Zeidman
American black-and-white films
American mystery films
1942 mystery films
1940s American films
1940s English-language films